Desmond "Dessie" Sloyan (born 2 February 1976) is an Irish former Gaelic footballer. His league and championship career at senior level with the Sligo county team spanned ten seasons from 1996 until 2006.

Playing career
Sloyan scored eight points in Sligo's unexpected victory over a Mick O'Dwyer-managed Kildare in the 2001 All-Ireland Senior Football Championship.

Managerial career
He has also had a successful managerial career in Gaelic Football, winning a Connacht Junior Club Football Championship in 2018 with his club Easkey  and also managing Sligo GAA U20s to their first ever provincial title at that age group when winning the 2022 Connacht Under-20 Football Championship.

He joined the Longford senior football team backroom team when Paddy Christie was appointed manager in August 2022.

Career statistics

References

1976 births
Living people
Easkey Gaelic footballers
Gaelic football selectors
Irish farmers
Longford county football team
Sligo inter-county Gaelic footballers